Jasuben Jayantilaal Joshi Ki Joint Family is an Indian daily soap that aired on NDTV Imagine.

Plot
The show tells the story of Jasuben Jyantilal's joint family, their beliefs and morals, and the different circumstances they face. It depicts the values of the family under Jasuben and Jyantilal Joshi. The nature of this show is based on the fact that the whole family lives their live happily then some problems happened and they get out of it with each other's help so basically this show portrays importants of joint family in a very entertaining and light hearted manner this show is very similar to star plus show Baa Bahu Aur Baby.

Characters

References

External links 
Jasuben Jayantilaal Joshi Ki Joint Family on Dangal Play 
Official Site
Characters Page

2008 Indian television series debuts
Imagine TV original programming
2009 Indian television series endings
Hats Off Productions